is a Japanese gravure idol and actress. She was born in Izumi-ku, Yokohama, Kanagawa, Japan. She is also known as her nickname "Yuka-chin", and has starred in a number of TV dramas and films.

Profile 
Yuka made her debut in 2004 after winning the Grand Prix award in Miss Magazine 2004. After her first DVD peach went on sale on March 25, 2004, her DVDs have constantly produced. Yuka also became a frequent guest on Matthew’s Best Hit TV. In the fall of 2004, Yuka’s popularity rose when she became the campaign girl for the Japanese convenience store, Circle K Sunkus. Currently, she belongs in a Japanese entertainment company, A-team, in which a number of Japanese actresses and models are belonged including Aki Hoshino.

Filmography

External links 
 Official profile of Yuka Kosaka in A-team website 
 

Japanese actresses
Japanese television personalities
Japanese gravure idols
1985 births
Living people
People from Yokohama